Yodtongthai Sor.Sommai (ยอดทองไท ส.สมหมาย) is a Thai Muay Thai fighter, nicknamed "cat with nine lives" (แมวเก้าชีวิตจอมคลาสสิค) due to his durability and tricky fighting style. He currently trains and fights out of Sor.Sommai gym in the Bang Kapi District of Bangkok. As of December 2021, current Rajadamnern Stadium Super featherweight champion Yodtongthai is ranked 22 at Lightweight by the World Muay Thai Organization (WMO) after over a year out of the ring.

Titles and accomplishments 
Rajadamnern Stadium

 2007 Rajadamnern Stadium 115 lbs Champion
 2009 Rajadamnern Stadium 108 lbs Champion
 2011 Rajadamnern Stadium 115 lbs Champion
2020 Rajadamnern Stadium 130 lbs Champion
Other
 S1 100 lbs Champion

Fight record

|- style="background:#fbb;"
| 2023-02-12|| Loss ||align=left| Kaewkangwan Priwayo || Muaydee VitheeThai + Jitmuangnon, Or.Tor.Gor.3 Stadium || Nonthaburi, Thailand || KO (punch and knee) || 4 || 
|- style="background:#fbb;"
| 2022-12-20|| Loss ||align=left| Kaewmongkol Priwayo || Muay Thai Lumpinee Pitaktam, Lumpinee Stadium || Bangkok, Thailand || Decision || 5 || 3:00
|-  style="background:#cfc;"
| 2022-11-09 || Win ||align=left| Gingsanglek Tor.Laksong ||Muay Thai Palangmai, Rajadamnern Stadium || Bangkok, Thailand || DQ (kick to a downed opponent)|| 2||
|- style="background:#cfc;"
| 2022-09-17|| Win||align=left| Ploywittaya Petchsimuen || Hippy Fight || Nakhon Si Thammarat province, Thailand || Decision || 5 || 3:00
|- style="background:#cfc;"
| 2022-08-20|| Win||align=left| Nungubon Sitchefboontham || SuekJaoMuayThai, Siam Omnoi Stadium || Samut Sakhon, Thailand || Decision || 5 || 3:00
|- style="background:#cfc;"
| 2022-06-25|| Win||align=left| Detduanglek Tded99|| SuekJaoMuayThai, Siam Omnoi Stadium || Samut Sakhon, Thailand || Decision || 5 || 3:00
|- style="background:#fbb;"
| 2022-03-30|| Loss||align=left| Phetwason Boybangna || Muay Thai Palangmai, Rajadamnern Stadium || Bangkok, Thailand || Decision || 5 || 3:00
|-  style="background:#fbb;"
| 2022-01-01|| Loss ||align=left| Phetpangan Mor.Ratanabandit ||SuekJaoMuayThai, Omnoi Stadium || Bangkok, Thailand || Decision || 5||3:00

|-  style="text-align:center; background:#cfc;"
| 2020-12-03 || Win ||align=left| Phetsukhumvit Boybangna || Rajadamnern Stadium || Bangkok, Thailand || Decision || 5 || 3:00
|-
! style=background:white colspan=9 |

|-  style="text-align:center; background:#cfc;"
| 2020-10-14 || Win ||align=left| Berkban Jonuvo || Rajadamnern Stadium || Bangkok, Thailand || Decision || 5 || 3:00

|-  style="text-align:center; background:#cfc;"
| 2020-09-02 || Win ||align=left| Chankrit Or.Pimonsri || Rajadamnern Stadium || Bangkok, Thailand || Decision || 5 || 3:00

|-  style="text-align:center; background:#cfc;"
| 2020-03-12 || Win ||align=left| Yodkhuntab Sor.Kor.Sungnaigym || Rajadamnern Stadium || Bangkok, Thailand || Decision || 5 || 3:00

|-  style="text-align:center; background:#fbb;"
| 2020-02-05 || Loss ||align=left| Phetmanee Por.Lakboon || Rajadamnern Stadium || Bangkok, Thailand || Decision || 5 || 3:00

|-  style="text-align:center; background:#cfc;"
| 2019-12-26 || Win ||align=left| Duangsompong Jitmuangnon || Rajadamnern Stadium || Bangkok, Thailand || Decision || 5 || 3:00

|-  style="text-align:center; background:#fbb;"
| 2019-11-20 || Loss ||align=left| Lamnamoonlek Tded99 || Rajadamnern Stadium || Bangkok, Thailand || Decision || 5 || 3:00

|-  style="text-align:center; background:#cfc;"
| 2019-09-10 || Win ||align=left| Extra SitWorapon || Lumpinee Stadium  || Bangkok, Thailand || KO (elbow) || 1 ||

|-  style="text-align:center; background:#fbb;"
| 2019-08-16 || Loss ||align=left| Ploywitthaya Nayokwitthungsong || Upcountry || Thailand || Decision || 5 || 3:00

|-  style="text-align:center; background:#cfc;"
| 2019-05-30 || Win ||align=left| Theppabut SitUbon || Rajadamnern Stadium || Bangkok, Thailand || Decision || 5 || 3:00

|-  style="text-align:center; background:#cfc;"
| 2019-04-25 || Win ||align=left| Moradokphet PhetyindeeAcademy || Rajadamnern Stadium || Bangkok, Thailand || Decision || 5 || 3:00

|-  style="text-align:center; background:#cfc;"
| 2019-03-18 || Win ||align=left| Khochasarn Wor.Wiwattananon || Rajadamnern Stadium || Bangkok, Thailand || KO || 4 ||

|-  style="text-align:center; background:#cfc;"
| 2019-02-07 || Win ||align=left| Jompichit Chuwattana || Rajadamnern Stadium || Bangkok, Thailand || Decision || 5 || 3:00

|-  style="text-align:center; background:#fbb;"
| 2018-07-29 || Loss ||align=left| Sibsaen Tor.Eawcharoentongphuket || Channel 7 Stadium || Bangkok, Thailand || Decision || 5 || 3:00

|-  style="text-align:center; background:#fbb;"
| 2018-06-02 || Loss ||align=left| Theppabut SitUbon || Lumpinee Stadium  || Bangkok, Thailand || Decision || 5 || 3:00

|-  style="text-align:center; background:#fbb;"
| 2018-04-22 || Loss ||align=left| Sakchainoi MU.Den || Channel 7 Stadium || Bangkok, Thailand || Decision || 5 || 3:00

|-  style="text-align:center; background:#fbb;"
| 2018-01-26 || Loss ||align=left| Sibsaen Tor.Eawcharoentongphuket || Upcountry || Thailand || Decision || 5 || 3:00

|-  style="text-align:center; background:#cfc;"
| 2017-12-19 || Win ||align=left| Theppabut SitUbon || Lumpinee Stadium  || Bangkok, Thailand || Decision || 5 || 3:00

|-  style="text-align:center; background:#cfc;"
| 2017-08-26 || Win ||align=left| Yutthakan Phet.Por.Tor.Or || Lumpinee Stadium || Bangkok, Thailand || Decision || 5 || 3:00

|-  style="text-align:center; background:#fbb;"
| 2016-08-05 || Loss ||align=left| Nuenglanlek Jitmuangnon || Upcountry || Thailand || Decision || 5 || 3:00

|-  style="text-align:center; background:#cfc;"
| 2016-06-26 || Win ||align=left| Phetmorakot Teeded99 || Jitmuangnon Stadium || Nonthaburi, Thailand || Decision || 5 || 3:00

|-  style="text-align:center; background:#fbb;"
| 2016-05-08 || Loss ||align=left| Mongkoldetlek Kesagym || Channel 7 Stadium || Bangkok, Thailand || Decision || 5 || 3:00

|-  style="text-align:center; background:#fbb;"
| 2016-03-29 || Loss ||align=left| Deksakda Sitsongpeenong || Lumpinee Stadium || Bangkok, Thailand || Decision || 5 || 3:00

|-  style="text-align:center; background:#cfc;"
| 2014-12-09 || Win ||align=left| Pokaew Fonjangchonburi || Lumpinee Stadium || Bangkok, Thailand || KO (elbow) || 2 ||

|-  style="text-align:center; background:#cfc;"
| 2014-09-30 || Win ||align=left| Saen Parunchai || Lumpinee Stadium || Bangkok, Thailand || Decision || 5 || 3:00
|-
! style=background:white colspan=9 |

|-  style="text-align:center; background:#cfc;"
| 2014-08-31 || Win ||align=left| Yutthakan Phet.Por.Tor.Or || Channel 7 Stadium || Bangkok, Thailand || KO (punch) || 2 ||

|-  style="text-align:center; background:#fbb;"
| 2013-07-09 || Loss ||align=left| Thanonchai Thanakorngym || Lumpinee Stadium || Bangkok, Thailand || Decision || 5 || 3:00

|-  style="text-align:center; background:#fbb;"
| 2012-11-30 || Loss ||align=left| Pettawee Sor Kittichai || Lumpinee Stadium || Bangkok, Thailand || Decision || 5 || 3:00

|-  style="text-align:center; background:#fbb;"
| 2012-11-09 || Loss ||align=left| Pettawee Sor Kittichai || Lumpinee Stadium || Bangkok, Thailand || Decision || 5 || 3:00

|-  style="background:#c5d2ea;"
| 2012-10-11 || Draw ||align=left| PhetUtong Or.Kwanmuang || Rajadamnern Stadium || Bangkok, Thailand || Decision || 5 || 3:00

|-  style="text-align:center; background:#c5d2ea;"
| 2012-06-28 || Draw ||align=left| Superbank Sakchaichote || Rajadamnern Stadium || Bangkok, Thailand || Decision || 5 || 3:00

|-  style="text-align:center; background:#cfc;"
| 2012-05-29 || Win ||align=left| Yokwitthaya Phetsimuen || Lumpinee Stadium || Bangkok, Thailand || Decision || 5 || 3:00

|-  style="text-align:center; background:#fbb;"
| 2012-04-30 || Loss ||align=left| Nongbeer Chokngamwong || Rajadamnern Stadium || Bangkok, Thailand || Decision || 5 || 3:00

|-  style="text-align:center; background:#fbb;"
| 2012-01-27 || Loss ||align=left| Nongbeer Chokngamwong || Lumpinee Stadium || Bangkok, Thailand || Decision || 5 || 3:00

|-  style="background:#fbb;"
| 2011-12-06 || Loss ||align=left| Yodwicha Por.Boonsit || Lumpinee Stadium || Bangkok, Thailand || KO (Elbow) || 4 ||

|-  style="text-align:center; background:#fbb;"
| 2011-08-18 || Loss ||align=left| Superbank Sakchaichote || Rajadamnern Stadium || Bangkok, Thailand || Decision || 5 || 3:00
|-
! style=background:white colspan=9 |

|-  style="text-align:center; background:#fbb;"
| 2010-12-15 || Loss ||align=left| Prajanchai Por.Phetnamtong || Rajadamnern Stadium || Bangkok, Thailand || Decision || 5 || 3:00

|-  style="background:#cfc;"
| 2010-08-27|| Win||align=left| Superbank Kwanmuang ||Lumpinee Stadium|| Bangkok, Thailand || Decision || 5 || 3:00

|-  style="background:#fbb;"
| 2010-04-25|| Loss||align=left| Norasing Lukbanyai ||MUAY 2010 2nd Muaylok ー Yodmuay Champions Cup, Semi Final|| Tokyo, Japan || KO (Left Hook) || 3 || 2:43

|-  style="text-align:center; background:#fbb;"
| 2010-02-11 || Loss ||align=left| Prajanchai Por.Phetnamtong || Rajadamnern Stadium || Bangkok, Thailand || Decision || 5 || 3:00

|-  style="text-align:center; background:#cfc;"
| 2009-12-10 || Win ||align=left| Prajanchai Por.Phetnamtong || Rajadamnern Stadium || Bangkok, Thailand || Decision || 5 || 3:00

|-  style="text-align:center; background:#cfc;"
| 2009-09-17 || Win ||align=left| Palangpon Piriyanoppachai || Rajadamnern Stadium || Bangkok, Thailand || Decision || 5 || 3:00
|-
! style=background:white colspan=9 |

|-  style="text-align:center; background:#cfc;"
| 2007 || Win ||align=left| Thanonchai Thanakorngym || Rajadamnern Stadium || Bangkok, Thailand || Decision || 5 || 3:00
|-
! style=background:white colspan=9 |

|}
Legend:

References

Yodtongthai Sor.Sommai
1993 births
Living people
Yodtongthai Sor.Sommai